Christophe Diedhiou (born 8 January 1988) is a Senegalese professional footballer who plays as a centre-back for  club Quevilly-Rouen. He played one match for the Senegal national team in 2014.

Club career
On 27 June 2022, Diedhiou signed with Ligue 2 club Quevilly-Rouen.

International career
Diedhiou made his senior international debut for Senegal as a second-half substitute in a friendly against Colombia on 31 May 2014.

References

External links
 

1988 births
Living people
People from Rufisque
Association football defenders
Senegalese footballers
Senegal international footballers
SAS Épinal players
US Créteil-Lusitanos players
Gazélec Ajaccio players
Royal Excel Mouscron players
FC Sochaux-Montbéliard players
US Quevilly-Rouen Métropole players
Ligue 2 players
Belgian Pro League players
Senegalese expatriate footballers
Expatriate footballers in France
Senegalese expatriate sportspeople in France
Expatriate footballers in Belgium
Senegalese expatriate sportspeople in Belgium